FC Stratford is a football club based in Stratford upon Avon, Warwickshire, England.

History
The club was founded in 2007 as Stratford Town A, joining the Midland Football Combination in 2009. In 2011, the club changed name to FC Stratford. FC Stratford entered the FA Vase for the first time in 2018–19.

Ground
The club currently groundshare with Stratford Town at Knights Lane in Tiddington.

Records
Best FA Vase performance: First qualifying round, 2018–19

References

External links
Official website

Association football clubs established in 2007
2007 establishments in England
Football clubs in England
Football clubs in Warwickshire
Stratford-upon-Avon
Midland Football Alliance
Midland Football Combination
Hellenic Football League